Museum Meermanno – House of the Book, formerly called Museum Meermanno-Westreenianum, is a museum named after Willem Hendrik Jacob van Westreenen van Tiellandt on the Prinsessegracht 30 in The Hague. It is remarkable for its collection of sculpture, books, etchings, and paintings, but is most attractive to visitors for its accurate upkeep of the 18th century Herenhuis interior with period furnishings and collectibles.

History

The museum is located in the former house of the book collector  (1783–1848), who himself was a great admirer of his cousin  (1751–1815), a book collector, traveler, and diarist. The museum is partly a personal memorial to Meerman, and focuses today on the written and printed books in all forms. The development of the design of old and modern books is the central theme.

The museum has a collection of books from all periods of Western history. Medieval manuscripts, their manufacture, restoration, and accompanying research are one of the most important features of the collection. The development of writing is shown through a bird's eye view of the layout and decoration of these manuscripts. Besides the medieval manuscripts, there are also fine incunabula, i.e. books printed before 1501.

In addition to the collection of old books, the museum also collects books printed from 1850 to the present day. The shape and design of the books are the central theme. Rotating exhibitions show various parts of the overall collection, while the house interior is worth a visit for the paintings by famous Dutch masters. The museum owns the largest collection of bookplates in the Netherlands. There is also an old fashioned movable-type printing press in the museum.

Origin of the museum
The museum is named after two avid book collectors: Willem Hendrik Jacob (Willem) baron van Westreenen van Tiellandt (1783–1848) and his cousin Johan Meerman (1751–1815). The baron substantially extended Meerman's collection, and since 1852 there is the museum. Since then the collection has been expanding.

External links

Meermanno-Westreenianum
Biographical museums in the Netherlands
Literary museums in the Netherlands
Historic house museums in the Netherlands
Printing press museums